A tug or tugboat is a boat that maneuvers vessels by pushing or towing them.

Tug or TUG may also refer to:

Transportation
A powerful aircraft used to tow gliders 
A common nickname for pushback tow tractors used at airports
Towboat
Turnham Green tube station, London, London Underground station code TUG

Geography
Tuğ, Azerbaijan, a village
Tug Fork, a tributary of the Big Sandy River in the United States

As a nickname
Tug Arundel (1862–1912), American Major League Baseball catcher
Tug Hulett (born 1983), American baseball player
Tug McGraw (1944–2004), Major League Baseball pitcher
Tug Thompson (1856–1938), Major League Baseball player
Tug Wilson (disambiguation), various people
Tug Yourgrau, American playwright and TV producer 
Tug O'Neale, fictional character in the Australian soap opera Far and Away

Arts and entertainment
Tug (film), a 2013 film
Tugs (TV series), a British children's TV series
Tug Records, a record label

TUG
TÜBİTAK National Observatory (Turkish: TÜBİTAK Ulusal Gozlemevi), an astronomical observatory in southern Turkey
TeX Users Group
Timed Up and Go test, a simple test to assess a person's physical mobility
The Ultimate Group, a record label and management company
Technical University of Gdańsk, former name of Gdańsk University of Technology, Poland

Other uses
Tug (banner), a symbol of power in Mongol and Turkish states
Tacoma Tugs, former name of minor league baseball team the Tacoma Rainiers
ISO 639 code for the Tunia language of Chad
nickname for King's Scholars at Eton College
A slang term for male masturbation

See also
 Tugg (disambiguation)

Lists of people by nickname